Paper Canyon is the debut studio album by English post-rock band Codes in the Clouds. It was produced by Justin Lockey and released on Erased Tapes Records in June 2009.

Background
The album was recorded over five days in Doncaster with producer Justin Lockey. According to guitarist Stephen Peeling, the title of the album is a metaphor for the band's music. "The idea is that a canyon is a big, grand indestructible thing. But if you had a paper canyon it'd be fragile in its detail, like our music."

Music
The music of Paper Canyon has been compared to post-rock bands such as Explosions in the Sky and Mono, along with 65daysofstatic, whom the band have called their "idols". Chris Hidden of Rock Sound noted that the songs are "slow burners" that are "not as immediate or obviously melodic as the likes of Explosions in the Sky or This Will Destroy You," but instead build to a "crescendo".

Critical reception
Paper Canyon was released on 1 June 2009 in the UK, Ireland, and Benelux on Erased Tapes Records. It was released on 4 June 2009 in Japan. German and American releases are planned for later in the year. The album received positive critical reviews. Hidden wrote that the album "might not be a classic post-rock record," but that "it brims with potential and suggests what's to come next should be something really special."

Track list
 "Fractures" (5:20)
 "Don't Go Awash in This Digital Landscape" (3:21)
 "Distant Street Lights" (5:06)
 "We Anchor in Hope" (5:42)
 "You Are Not What You Think You Are" (9:55)
 "The Distance Between Us" (10:00)

Personnel
Codes in the Clouds
 Stephen Peeling (guitar)
 Ciaran Morahan (guitar)
 Rob Smith (guitar)
 Jack Major (drums)
 Joe Power (bass)

Additional personnel
 Justin Lockey (production)
 Robert Raths (cover art)

References

2009 debut albums
Codes in the Clouds albums
Erased Tapes Records albums